The flowering plant genus Trochetiopsis consists of two extant and one extinct species endemic to the island of Saint Helena (South Atlantic Ocean). They were formerly placed in the family Sterculiaceae, but this is included in the expanded Malvaceae in the APG and most subsequent systematics.

There is evidence from fossil pollen that the Trochetiopsis lineage has been on Saint Helena since the late Miocene (some 9.5 million years).

Description
The species of this genus were formerly included in the genus Trochetia, but were separated by Marais in 1981 on the basis of geography and morphological characters. Unlike in Trochetia, the Trochetiopsis flowers have only five stamens, and the sepals generally have appressed sericeous indumentum on their interior faces (although one species, T. melanoxylon, lacks this last character).

The wood of all the species is attractively coloured and is used in island inlay work.

Phylogeny 
Trochetiopsis is closely related to the genera Melhania and Paramelhania, with a 2021 study subsuming Trochetiopsis and Paramelhania into Melhania.

Species
There are three species (two living, one extinct), and one named hybrid:
 Trochetiopsis erythroxylon. Extinct in the wild
 Trochetiopsis ebenus. The St Helena ebony (critically endangered in the wild).
 Trochetiopsis melanoxylon - Extinct.
 Trochetiopsis × benjaminii (T. erythroxylon × T. ebenus).

See also
 Flora of St Helena

Footnotes

References
  (1981) Trochetiopsis (Sterculiaceae), a new genus from St Helena. Kew Bulletin 36(3): 645–646. HTML abstract
  (1995): The endemic Flora of St Helena. Anthony Nelson Ltd, Oswestry.
  (1990): The history of the endemic flora of St Helena: late Miocene Trochetiopsis-like pollen from St Helena and the origin of Trochetiopsis. New Phytologist 114: 159–165.

External links
Trochetiopsis gallery

 
Flora of Saint Helena
Dombeyoideae
Malvaceae genera